Jamie Luchini (born August 10, 1994) is an American soccer player who last played for Bethlehem Steel in the United Soccer League.

Career

Youth and college 
Luchini played four years of college soccer at Lehigh University between 2012 and 2015.

Luchini also played with Premier Development League side D.C. United U-23 in 2015.

Professional 
Luchini went undrafted in the 2016 MLS SuperDraft, instead signing with United Soccer League side Bethlehem Steel in April 2016. After 16 appearances for Steel FC, Luchini was released at the conclusion of the 2016 season.

References

External links 
 Bethlehem Steel FC player profile

1994 births
Living people
American soccer players
Association football forwards
Lehigh Mountain Hawks men's soccer players
D.C. United U-23 players
Philadelphia Union II players
USL League Two players
USL Championship players
Soccer players from Pennsylvania